Cristina Trivulzio di Belgiojoso (28 June 1808, Milan, Lombardy, Italy5 July 1871, near Milan) was an Italian noblewoman, the princess of Belgiojoso, who played a prominent part in Italy's struggle for independence. She is also notable as a writer and journalist.

Life
Cristina Trivulzio was the daughter of Girolamo Trivulzio and the Vittoria dei Marchesi Gherardini (member of the Gherardini family). Her father died soon after her birth and her mother remarried to Alessandro Visconti d'Aragona; she had a stepbrother and three stepsisters through this second marriage. By her own account "I was as a child melancholy, serious, introverted, quiet, so shy that I often happen to burst into tears in the living room of my mother because I realized that I was being looked at or that they wanted me to talk."
When she was thirteen, her stepfather was arrested since he was allegedly involved in the riots of 1820-21, while Ernesta Bisi, her drawing teacher, was close to the Carboneria secret society.

She married at 16, at the Church of St. Fedele in Milan on 24 September 1824. She was considered the richest heiress in Italy, with a dowry of 400,000 francs. Her libertine husband, Prince Emilio Barbiano di Belgiojoso, caused a separation soon after. They did not divorce and remained on cordial terms throughout their lives.

She had begun associating with Mazzinian revolutionaries through her art teacher Ernesta Bisi and stepfather Marquis Alessandro Visconti d'Aragona. This brought her to the attention of the Austrian authorities and she fled penniless to France. Her husband sent her money, and she bought an apartment close to the Madeleine, although she lived in relative poverty.

Eventually more money was sent, and she moved house and set up a salon. During the 1830s and 1840s her Paris salon became a meeting place for Italian revolutionaries such as Vincenzo Gioberti, Niccolò Tommaseo, and Camillo Cavour. She also associated with the European artistic intelligentsia, including Alexis de Tocqueville, Honoré de Balzac, Alfred de Musset, Victor Hugo, Heinrich Heine, Franz Liszt, and played an important influence in the initial singing career of "Mario the tenor" Giovanni M. de Candia. Other acquaintances were the historians Augustin Thierry and Francois Mignet who would play a major role in her life. It was at her salon that she hosted the famous March 31, 1837 duel between Liszt and Sigismond Thalberg to determine who was the greater pianist. Belgiojoso’s judgment was, "Thalberg is the greatest pianist, but there is only one Liszt."

In 1838, she had a daughter, Mary. The natural father was certainly not her estranged husband; it has been speculated that he may have been her friend Francois Mignet or her personal secretary Bolognini.

She visited Ireland in 1839. Old Business Records  of Leahy's Inn Abbeyfeale, Co. Kerry record that she hired 4 horses – Mouse, Jack, Poll & Nancy – and 2 drivers – Brown & Farrell – for her onward journey by Carriage on 2nd Oct 1839.These are the only known surviving records of her stay in Ireland. A plaque on the site of the inn's location commemorates her visit.

In the 1848 Italian revolutions, she organized and financed a troop of soldiers and fought in the Milanese uprising against the Austrians for Italy's independence. After the insurrection failed, she returned to Paris and published articles in the influential magazine Revue des Deux Mondes describing the struggle in Italy.

In 1849 she returned to Italy to support the Roman Republic formed in the Papal States by Mazzini and others. She became a hospital director during the brief life of the republic until it was suppressed by French troops.

Cristina fled, accompanied by her daughter, first to Malta and then to Constantinople, from where she published an account of the republic and its fall in the French magazine Le National in 1850. She bought land in the remote Ciaq-Maq-Oglou area and then traveled to Syria, Lebanon and Palestine. Cristina published accounts of her experiences in the orient and found the condition of women there particularly disturbing. She published Of Women's Condition and of their Future (1866) in which she argues that deprived of education, women come to accept the oppressive conditions in which they find themselves.

She lived in exile in Turkey for eight years before returning to Italy in 1856 and working with the statesman Camillo Benso Cavour for Italian unification which was achieved in 1861.

In 1858 her estranged husband, Emilio—still legally her spouse—died. A few years later she was finally able to legitimize her daughter, Mary.

Her final years were spent in retirement between Milan and Lake Como in the company of her daughter and son-in-law, Marquis Ludovico, her English governess Miss Parker, and her Turkish servant, a freed slave. During this period she continued to write and publish until her death at age 63.

Works
 Essai sur la formation du dogme catholique, 1842 (Essay on the Formation of Catholic Dogma)
 L'Italie et la révolution italienne de 1848, 1849 (Italy and the Italian Revolution of 1848)
 Souvenirs dans l'exil, 1850 (Memories in Exile)
 Récits turques, 1856 to 1858 (Turkish Short Stories)
 Asie Mineure et Syrie, 1858 (Asia Minor and Syria)
 Scènes de la vie turque, 1858
  Of Women's Condition and of their Future, 1866 (Della condizione delle donne e del loro avvenire)
 Osservazioni sullo stato dell'Italia e del suo avvenire, 1868 (Observations on Italy and Its Future)
 Sulla moderna politica internazionale, 1869 (About Modern International Politics)

Notes

References
 
 
Biographies
 Raffaello Barbiera, La principessa di Belgioioso, i suoi amici e nemici, il suo tempo, Milano, Treves, 1902 Testo in facsimile - "La biblioteca digitale di Milano" Raphael Barbiera, Princess of Belgioioso, her friends and enemies, her time, Milan, Treves, 1902 Text in facsimile - "The digital library of Milan"
 Raffaello Barbiera, Passioni del Risorgimento. Raphael Barbiera, Passions of the Risorgimento. Nuove pagine sulla Principessa Belgiojoso e il suo tempo, Milano, Treves 1903 New pages on the princess Belgiojoso and her time, Milan, Treves 1903
 Aldobrandino Malvezzi, La principessa Cristina di Belgioioso, Milano, Treves 1936 Aldobrandino Malvezzi, Princess Cristina of Belgioioso, Milan, Treves 1936
 H. H. Remsen Whitehouse, A Revolutionary Princess. Remsen Whitehouse, A Revolutionary Princess. Christina Belgiojoso Trivulzio Her life and times, EP Dutton, New York, 1906 Christina Belgiojoso Trivulzio Her Life and Times, EP Dutton, New York, 1906
 Augustine-Thierry, La Princess Belgiojoso, Librairie Plon, 1926 Augustine-Thierry, The Princess Belgiojoso, Librairie Plon, 1926
 , Donna più che donna, Garzanti, Milano, 1946 , woman as woman, Garzanti, 1946
 Luigi Severgnini, La principessa di Belgioioso. Severgnini Luigi, Princess of Belgioioso. Vita e opere, Milano, Virgilio 1972 Life and Works, Milan, Virgil 1972
 Emilio Guicciardi, Cristina di Belgiojoso Trivulzio cento anni dopo, Milano 1973 Emilio Guicciardi, Cristina Belgiojoso Trivulzio hundred years later, Milan 1973
 Charles Neilson Gattey, Cristina di Belgiojoso [A bird of curious plumage], Firenze, Vallardi 1974 Charles Neilson Gattey, Christina of Belgiojoso [A curious bird of plumage], Florence, Vallardi 1974
 Brett Archer Brombert, Cristina Belgiojoso, Milano, Dall'Oglio 1981 Brett Archer Brombert, Cristina Belgiojoso, Milan, 1981 Dall'Oglio
 , Cristina di Belgiojoso, Lodi, Lodigraf, 1982  Christina of Belgiojoso, Lodi, Lodigraf, 1982
 Ludovico Incisa e Alberica Trivulzio, Cristina di Belgioioso, Milano, Rusconi 1984 Ludovico Incisa and Alberica Trivulzio Cristina Belgioioso, Milan, Rusconi 1984
 Arrigo Petacco, La principessa del Nord, Milano, Rizzoli 1992 Arrigo Petacco, Princess of the North, Milan, Rizzoli 1992
 Angela Nanetti, Cristina di Belgioioso, una principessa italiana EL, Trieste, 2002. Angela Nanetti, Christina of Belgioioso, an Italian princess EL, Trieste, 2002
 Emmanuel-Philibert de Savoie, Princesse Cristina, le roman d'une exilée 2002, Edition Michel Lafon Emmanuel-Philibert de Savoie, Princess Cristina, le roman d'une exilée 2002, Edition Michel Lafon
 Mino Rossi, Cristina Trivulzio, principessa di Belgioioso. Mino Rossi, Cristina Trivulzio, Princess of Belgioioso. Il pensiero politico 2005, Edizioni Franciacorta Political thought in 2005, Edizioni Franciacorta
 Mino Rossi, Principessa libertà, Ferrara, Tufani, 2006 Mino Rossi, Princess freedom,'' Ferrara, Tufan, 2006
 Fugazza, Mariachiara / Karoline Rörig (eds.), "La prima donna d'Italia". Cristina Trivulzio di Belgiojoso tra politica e giornalismo, Milano, FrancoAngeli 2010
 Karoline Rörig, Cristina Trivulzio di Belgiojoso (1808-1871), Geschichtsschreibung und Politik im Risorgimento, Bonn 2013

External links
 
 
 Site dedicated to Christine Trivulzio of Belgiojoso
 "Chi era Cristina Trivulzio di Belgioioso?" "Who was Christina Trivulzio of Belgioioso?"
 "Cristina Trivulzio di Belgioioso, la donna che visse cinque volte" "Cristina Trivulzio of Belgioioso, the woman who lived five times"
 "Le scene di vita turca di Cristina" "The scenes of Turkish life for Cristina"

1808 births
1871 deaths
Nobility from Milan
Italian untitled nobility
Italian women journalists
Italian activists
19th-century Italian journalists
19th-century Italian women writers
19th-century Italian writers
Italian exiles
Journalists from Milan
Italian salon-holders